Summoning Salt is an American speedrunner and YouTuber known for his video documentaries about the history of speedrunning records. As of December 2022 he has over 1.5 million subscribers.

Career 
Summoning Salt is named after a mispronunciation of the ingredients of a 30-year-old can of Heinz Spaghetti Hoops by Ashens. He was inspired by a live stream by Sinister1 about the history of speedrunning records of a particular fight in Mike Tyson's Punch-Out!!. Salt wanted to do something similar and, in January 2017, he released "World Record Progression: Mike Tyson". Because of its positive reception, Salt started producing videos about other video games. In March 2022, he had over 30 histories documented, and 1.25 million subscribers. His videos have also crept up in length, more often hitting the 45-minute mark as they tackle longer and more complicated histories. Salt said in an interview that the research is the longest step of producing a video: "I have to contact various community members, form a small Discord server, ask questions, watch tutorials, [and] play the game itself." Finding the narrative is another factor: "I have to figure out which storylines are important, what to emphasize, and how to emphasize it. This process also takes several weeks."

In September 2022, his video about the history of Mega Man 2 speedruns was age-restricted for "excessive swearing", and, after Salt made an appeal and it had been accepted, the video was age-restricted again one week later for breaking the "sex and nudity policy", despite the video having no sexual or nude content. News outlets reported on the story, emphasizing the confusing moderating system of YouTube.

In January 2021, Salt was featured in a podcast by the Video Game History Foundation. He narrates Running With Speed, a documentary about the speedrunning community, which was released on streaming platforms on January 6, 2023.

Salt currently holds the world record for Mike Tyson's Punch-Out!!. In March 2022, he got a world record in the game's blindfolded category.

Reception 
Salt's videos have been featured on Kotaku, Mashable, Vice, and Polygon. Jay Castello of Eurogamer called Summoning Salt "the most famous creator in the speedrun history space". Adam Downer of Know Your Meme said: "Any video game fan and YouTube enjoyer has likely stumbled across Summoning Salt, arguably the internet's premier speedrunning historian who has carved a significant niche on the platform with his lengthy, detailed and surprisingly gripping documentaries about the history of various video games' world record speedruns." About his video regarding the history of level 4-2 in Super Mario Bros., Polygon Charlie Hall said: "Using archival footage and in-depth knowledge of the speedrunning community, Summoning Salt has created a legitimate documentary of the level. Not only does he explain the tricks and techniques needed to get through it as quickly as possible, he focuses on the evolution of those strategies over time and the people who discovered them. It's a master class in speedrunning a classic Nintendo game, and an excellent entrée into the genre as a whole."

References 

American YouTubers
Gaming-related YouTube channels
Video game journalism
Video game speedrunners